The 2007 Melanesian Championships in Athletics took place between August 14–19, 2007. The event was held at the Barlow Park in Cairns, Australia, jointly with the OAA Grand Prix Series.  Many athletes utilised the competitions preparing for the upcoming IAAF World Championships in Osaka, Japan.  Detailed reports were given for the OAA.

A total of 38 events were contested, 19 by men and 19 by women.

Medal summary
Complete results can be found on the Oceania Athletics Association webpage, and at sportfieber.pytalhost.com.

In high jump, long jump and triple jump, as well as in shot put, discus throw, and javelin throw, there were separate open competitions for the Melanesian championships and the OAA Grand Prix Series held on different days.  In the sprint events, athletes not competing for the Melanesian Championships were assigned to the B finals.

Men

5.): In the discus throw event, Travis Ambrum from / North Queensland was 2nd in 42.30m competing as a guest.

Women

8.): The 400 metres hurdles event was won by Jacqueline Stresing from / North Queensland in 63.17 running as a guest.
10.): In the discus throw event, Cheryl LeBrun from / North Queensland was 2nd in 13.63m competing as a guest.

Mixed

Medal table (unofficial)

Participation
The participation of athletes from 7 countries and 6 guest countries from
Oceania was reported.  In addition, two local teams comprising athletes from the organizing Athletics North Queensland (ANQ) (representing North Queensland) and from the Athletics Australia's Jump Start program for indigenous athletes ("Jump Start Australia") competed.

 
 
 Jump Start Australia

 
/ North Queensland
 
 
 

Guest countries from Micronesia and Polynesia:

References

Melanesian Championships in Athletics
International athletics competitions hosted by Australia
Melanesian Championships
Melanesian Championships in Athletics
August 2007 sports events in Australia